A spirit level is an instrument used to determine whether a surface is exactly horizontal or vertical.

Spirit level can also refer to:
Engineer's spirit level, a specialised instrument used to level machinery
Spirit Level Film, British film production and distribution company
Spirit Level, Australian record label
The Spirit Level (poetry collection), 1996 poetry collection by Seamus Heaney
The Spirit Level: Why More Equal Societies Almost Always Do Better, 2009 book by Wilkinson and Pickett
 Spirit levelling, a surveying technique